N-Ethylheptedrone is a recreational designer drug from the substituted cathinone family, with stimulant effects. It is a homologue of related drugs such as ethcathinone, N-ethylbuphedrone and N-ethylhexedrone but with a longer pentyl side chain. It was first identified in Hungary in 2019, and has since been reported in New Zealand.

See also 
 α-PEP
 3F-NEH
 4F-POP
 Ephylone
 N-Ethylpentedrone
 N-Ethylhexylone
 N-Ethylheptylone

References 

Designer drugs
Cathinones